Protaetia elegans is a species of flower chafers, scarab beetles in the subfamily Cetoniinae. It is found in Taiwan.

References

External links 

 
 Protaetia elegans at insectoid.info

Cetoniinae
Beetles described in 1938
Fauna of Taiwan